Uusikaupunki is a town and municipality of Finland.

The municipality is unilingually Finnish. Both its Finnish and Swedish names translate literally to "new town". The original name of the main village that was incorporated into Uusikaupunki was Kalainen (roughly translated from Finnish as "rich in fish"). The surrounding region, and especially the neighboring town of Kalanti, which merged with Uusikaupunki in 1993, was already a lively marketplace for wooden objects and salt in the early Middle Ages. Uusikaupunki was founded to legalize this trade.

Geography
Uusikaupunki is located in the Vakka-Suomi sub-region on the shores of the Gulf of Bothnia. The  (Sirppujoki) flows through the town and flows into the reservoir of Uusikaupunki in the northern part of the town. The freshwater pool was built in 1965 when the bays of Velhovesi and Ruotsinvesi were dammed from the sea. The area of the basin is about 40 km², and the town and part of Vakka-Suomi get their domestic water from it. The acidity of the freshwater basin has caused some fish deaths as well as an overgrowth of aquatic plants.

In 2011, the Bothnian Sea National Park was established in the outer archipelago of Uusikaupunki. The area, named Finland's largest marine national park, begins in the south of the Kustavi archipelago and ends in the north in the Merikarvia archipelago.

Cityscape

The center of Uusikaupunki is built according to the so-called "grid plan layout" and is one of the best-preserved Empire-style wooden house blocks in the country. Today, there are a total of 40 blocks left. Because of this, the area is characterized by wide streets and large blocks with the narrow alleys. In a town plan drawn up in 1649, there were 27 blocks in the town center that required residential buildings to be built. The town was built of densely red-soil houses, and the estates were not pleasantly considered deserted. The town also expanded around the base of the bay, where a suburban settlement was built. Green areas were not established in the town until the 1850s, when a new town plan was planned for the town.

According to the Finnish Heritage Agency, the town's most significant public buildings are the Seikow's school building and the Uusikaupunki's library building. Seikow's Neo-Renaissance building was one of the oldest school buildings in Finland. The town library is thought to be one of the oldest functioning library buildings in the country; it was founded in 1861. The first glass factory of Finland, which was located in Uusikaupunki, was destroyed in a fire in 1685. In the center of Uusikaupunki is the Bonk Centre museum, which houses a collection of products from the fictional Bonk Business Company. In addition, the town has a cultural history museum. A notable building in the town center is also Wallila, designed by F. A. Sjöström and located on a hill near the sea. It is now used as venue for Crusell Week music festival, which is named after composer-clarinetist Bernhard Crusell, who was born in Uusikaupunki.

History
The town of Uusikaupunki was founded as a town with the rights of commerce on April 19, 1617 by decree by Gustav II Adolf. In 1721, the Peace of Nystad was signed in Uusikaupunki, ending the Great Northern War between Sweden and Russia, but as the Crimean War broke out in 1853, Uusikaupunki was attacked by French Navy and British Navy in 1855 during the Åland War. Up to the 19th century, Uusikaupunki was an important port for commerce and fishing, and up to the latter half of the 20th century, the Port of Uusikaupunki retained an important ship-building industry.

Economy
Uusikaupunki is the home of Valmet Automotive, a contract automobile mechanical production company, producing cars and vehicles for brands such as Mercedes-Benz. It was founded in 1968 as Saab-Valmet for manufacturing Saab cars. As of June 2017, Valmet is assembling Mercedes-Benz A-Class and Mercedes-Benz GLC-Class cars. Furthermore, it produces the first commercially available solar-electric vehicle - the Lightyear 0 - as of November 2022. Today, Valmet is one of the largest and most significant employers in Uusikaupunki.

Politics
The results of the 2011 Finnish parliamentary election in Uusikaupunki were:
Social Democratic Party   26.6%
True Finns   23.4%
National Coalition Party   19.6%
Centre Party   13.1%
Left Alliance   8.1%
Christian Democrats   4.2%
Green League   2.3%
Communist Party of Finland   0.7%
Swedish People's Party   0.6%

Points of interest
Uusikaupunki is home to the Bonk museum.

Other attractions include:
Restaurant Pursiseuran Paviljonki
Myllymäki Park

Culture

Music
Karjurock, the annual rock music festival has been held in Uusikaupunki since 2007.

Sports
The town was co-host of the 1982 FIBA Europe Under-16 Championship for Women.

Notable people

Aimo Cajander, Prime Minister of Finland (1922, 1924, 1937–39)
Bernhard Henrik Crusell, virtuoso clarinetist and composer
Robert Wilhelm Ekman, painter
Anna Eriksson, singer
Joni Haverinen (born 1987), ice hockey player
Gordon Herbert, basketball coach and former player
Eetu Koski (born 1992), ice hockey player
Awak Kuier (born 2001), basketball player
Jarmo Kuusisto (born 1961), ice hockey player
Gerald Lee Sr., former basketball player
Gerald Lee Jr., basketball player
Aleksi Lehtonen, Archbishop of Finland (1945–1951)
Johan Jakob Nervander, physicist, meteorologist and poet (1805–1848)
Ilmari Saarelainen, actor
Martti Simojoki, Archbishop of Finland (1964–78)
Kari Takko (born 1962), ice hockey goaltender

International relations

Twin towns – sister cities
Uusikaupunki is twinned with:
 Antsla, Estonia
 Haderslev, Denmark
 Veliky Novgorod, Novgorod Oblast, Russia
 Sandefjord, Norway
 Szentendre, Hungary
 Varberg, Sweden

See also
 Kalanti

References

External links

Town of Uusikaupunki – Official site

 
Cities and towns in Finland
Populated coastal places in Finland
Grand Duchy of Finland
Populated places established in 1617
1617 establishments in Sweden